Q. gracilis may refer to:
 Quedrastichodella gracilis, an hymenopteran species found in Japan
 Quinqueloculina gracilis, a foraminifer species in the genus Quinqueloculina

See also
 Gracilis (disambiguation)